O, or o, is the fifteenth letter and the fourth vowel letter in the Latin alphabet, used in the modern English alphabet, the alphabets of other western European languages and others worldwide. Its name in English is o (pronounced ), plural oes.

History

Its graphic form has remained fairly constant from Phoenician times until today. The name of the Phoenician letter was
ʿeyn, meaning "eye", and indeed its shape originates simply as a drawing of a human eye (possibly inspired by the corresponding Egyptian hieroglyph, cf. Proto-Sinaitic script).
Its original sound value was that of a consonant, probably , the sound represented by the cognate Arabic letter ع ʿayn.

The use of this Phoenician letter for a vowel sound is due to the early Greek alphabets, which adopted the letter as O "omicron" to represent the vowel . The letter was adopted with this value in the Old Italic alphabets, including the early Latin alphabet. In Greek, a variation of the form later came to distinguish this long sound (Omega, meaning "large O") from the short o (Omicron, meaning "small o"). Greek omicron gave rise to the corresponding Cyrillic letter O and the early Italic letter to runic ᛟ.

Even alphabets that are not derived from Semitic tend to have similar forms to represent this sound; for example, the creators of the Afaka and Ol Chiki scripts, each invented in different parts of the world in the last century, both attributed their vowels for 'O' to the shape of the mouth when making this sound.

Use in writing systems

English
The letter  is the fourth most common letter in the English alphabet. Like the other English vowel letters, it has associated "long" and "short" pronunciations. In English there is also a "short"  as in fox, which sounds slightly different in different dialects. In most dialects of British English, it is either an open-mid back rounded vowel  or an open back rounded vowel ; in American English, it is most commonly an unrounded back  to a central vowel .

In other contexts, especially before a letter with a minim,  may represent the sound , as in 'son' or 'love'. It can also represent the semivowel  as in choir or quinoa.

In English, the letter  in isolation before a noun, usually capitalized, marks the vocative case, as in the titles to O Canada or O Captain! My Captain! or certain verses of the Bible.

Other languages

 is commonly associated with the open-mid back rounded vowel , mid back rounded vowel  or close-mid back rounded vowel  in many languages. Other languages use  for various values, usually back vowels which are at least partly open.

Other systems
In the International Phonetic Alphabet,  represents the close-mid back rounded vowel.

Related characters

Descendants and related characters in the Latin alphabet

Derived signs, symbols and abbreviations
 Ꝋ ꝋ : Forms of O were used for medieval scribal abbreviations
 ∅ : empty set symbol
 º : Masculine ordinal indicator
 Calligraphic O (𝒪, 𝓸): Mathematical Alphanumeric Symbols

Ancestors and siblings in other alphabets
 𐤏 : Semitic letter Ayin, from which the following symbols originally derive
 Ο ο : Greek letter Omicron
  : Coptic letter O, which derives from Greek omicron
 О о : Cyrillic letter O, which also derives from Omicron
 𐌏 : Old Italic O, which derives from Greek Omicron, and is the ancestor of modern Latin O
 Օ օ : Armenian letter O

Computing codes

 1

Other representations

See also
 Oxygen, symbol O, a chemical element
 O mark
 Open O (Ɔ ɔ)
 0 (zero). The capital letter O may be mistaken or misused for the number 0, as they appear quite identical in some typefaces. Early typewriters did not have a 'zero' key: users were actually expected to use capital O.

References

External links

 

ISO basic Latin letters
Vowel letters